Ging  or Gings may refer to:

 Ging (film), a 1964 Philippine film
 Ging (live CD), a GNU variant
 Ging (surname), a surname
 Ging, the stage name of musician Adam Feeney (f.k.a. Frank Dukes)
 Gings, Indiana, a community in the United States
 Ging Freecss, a character in the manga series Hunter × Hunter

See also

 Ginge (disambiguation)
 Gingy
 Jing (disambiguation)